Thomas Ulmer (born 25 July 1956) is a German politician of the Christian Democratic Union (CDU) who served as a Member of the European Parliament from 2004 until 2014. In this capacity, he was the Parliament's rapporteur on the EU's 2020 target to reduce  emissions from new passenger cars.

References

 Thomas ULMER MEP Profile from European Parliament.

1956 births
MEPs for Germany 1999–2004
MEPs for Germany 2004–2009
MEPs for Germany 2009–2014
Living people
Christian Democratic Union of Germany MEPs